"Christmas in Harlem" is a song by hip-hop recording artist Kanye West. The track features rapper Cyhi the Prynce and R&B singer Teyana Taylor, both of whom are signed to West's label GOOD Music. Produced by Hit-Boy, it is a christmas hip hop song that contains samples of "Ain't Nothing Like the Real Thing" and "Mercy Mercy Me (The Ecology)", both by soul musician Marvin Gaye, and "Strawberry Letter 23" by singer-songwriter Shuggie Otis. The track features a holiday theme, and features various references to Christmas and customs associated with the holiday.

Originally released as a part of West's free music giveaway series GOOD Fridays, the song was later released as a single onto iTunes on December 17, 2010. The song received positive reviews from critics, who complimented its lyrics and compared it favorably to other Christmas-themed hip-hop songs.

Background
"Christmas in Harlem" was produced by Hit-Boy, a producer signed to West's label GOOD Music. Going into detail about how his connections with West began and how the track's beat ended up with West, Hit-Boy explained: "My boy Dala Roc hooked me up with Kanye’s cousin, Ricky, [...] This was around the time when he started working on My Beautiful Dark Twisted Fantasy. I just kept sending him beats to try and get one on there. Then, on the night of Kanye's New York release party, Ricky called saying Kanye wanted to use one of my beats for a Christmas song." The song contains samples of two songs by soul musician Marvin Gaye: "Ain't Nothing Like the Real Thing" and "Mercy Mercy Me (The Ecology)", the former being a collaboration with soul singer Tammi Terrell. It also contains samples of "Strawberry Letter 23", originally written and performed by singer-songwriter Shuggie Otis. Both Gaye and Otis are given songwriting credits on "Christmas in Harlem" for use of the samples.

Before its official release, the track first leaked to the Internet on December 15, 2010. "Christmas in Harlem" was later released as a part of West's free music giveaway series GOOD Fridays. The version of "Christmas in Harlem" released as a part of GOOD Fridays featured additional contributions from rappers Cam'ron, Jim Jones, Vado, Pusha T and Big Sean as well as R&B singer Musiq Soulchild. The version of the track only featuring contributions from West, CyHi the Prynce and Teyana Taylor was later released as a single to the iTunes Store on December 17, 2010.

Critical reception
"Christmas in Harlem" received positive reviews from critics. Giving the song a three-and-a-half star rating, Chuck Eddy of Rolling Stone stated: "Kanye's tinsel-tinted stocking stuffer sounds uncharacteristically tossed-off, as if he's preoccupied with the Xmas shopping spree he says he's planning. But actual Harlem R&B hopeful Teyana Taylor offers warmth from the wind chill, eventually slipping into the comfy melody from the Brothers Johnson's 'Strawberry Letter 23.' And gruff-rapping Atlanta Santa CyHi Da Prynce promises presents for non-Christian kiddies, too — hauled in a Porsche-speed sleigh." The magazine later included the song in its list of "The Greatest Rock & Roll Christmas Songs", describing it favorably as a follow-up to "Christmas in Hollis", a similarly themed Christmas song by hip-hop group Run-D.M.C. In his description of the track, Andy Greene of Rolling Stone wrote: "It's only been out for a year, but Kanye West's follow-up to Run-D.M.C.'s 'Christmas in Hollis' is already a classic. With help from Teyana Taylor, Cam'Ron, Jim Jones and Pusha T, West paints a vivid and cheerful portrait of the season." Becky Bain of Idolator wrote of the track: "Soulful, sweet and sprightly, it's one of the most joyful tracks we’ve heard from Kanye . Maybe even ever?"

Commercial performance
"Christmas in Harlem" peaked at numbers 13 and 3 on the Billboard Bubbling Under Hot 100 Singles and Bubbling Under R&B/Hip-Hop Singles charts respectively on the chart week of January 8, 2011.

Charts

References

2010 singles
American Christmas songs
Kanye West songs
Songs written by Kanye West
Song recordings produced by Hit-Boy
Roc-A-Fella Records singles
Songs written by Marvin Gaye
Songs written by Hit-Boy
2010 songs
Songs written by Cyhi the Prynce
Posse cuts